City Slickers II: The Legend of Curly's Gold is a 1994 American Western comedy film directed by Paul Weiland. It is the sequel to City Slickers (1991) and stars Billy Crystal, Daniel Stern, Jon Lovitz, and Jack Palance. Although a mild financial success, the film did not reach the popularity of the first, receiving generally negative responses from critics.

Plot
A year after the events of the first film, Mitch Robbins is a much happier and livelier man, having moved out of the city. He is the manager at the radio station, and has employed his best friend, Phil Berquist. However, he is plagued with nightmares about deceased trail boss, Curly, and believe he may still be alive. On his 40th birthday, Mitch sees a man resembling Curly on the train. He later finds a treasure map belonging to Lincoln Washburn hidden in Curly's old cowboy hat, albeit with a missing corner. He and Phil investigate the map's contents and learn that Lincoln was Curly's father and a train robber in the Old West. In 1908, he infamously stole and hid one million dollars in gold bullion in the deserts near Las Vegas. With an impending trip to Las Vegas for a convention, Mitch decides to search for the gold (now worth twenty million) along with Phil, and his immature younger brother, Glen.

Several mishaps ensue, such as Glen accidentally burning a hole in the map with a magnifying glass, Mitch nearly falling off a cliff while retrieving it, and Phil believing a rattlesnake bit him when he sits on a cactus. They are ambushed by the two cowboys who sold them their supplies. They demand the map, since Phil recklessly blabbed about the gold. Just as they are poised to kill them, a man resembling Curly appears and fights them off. He is Duke, Curly's identical twin brother. He explains that long ago, their father had plans to find the gold with his sons once he was no longer being monitored, but he died before he could. On her death bed, their mother gave Curly the map, and he contacted Duke to find him so that they could find the gold together, but he died on the cattle drive the previous year. Duke learned from Cookie that Mitch had Curly's belongings, and so sought him out, though Mitch believed he was Curly. Though Duke is prepared to take the map and find the gold by himself, Mitch chastises him for his attitude, reasoning that Curly would not approve. Out of respect for Curly, Duke relents and allows the others to accompany him and share the gold.

A reckless act by Mitch causes a stampede in which the map and almost all their supplies are lost. Thanks to Glen's memory, they are able to press on and find the location of the cave where the gold is hidden. They eventually find it, but are confronted by two armed cowboys also seeking it. In the ensuing fight, Glen is shot, but Duke discovers the bullets to be blanks with red paint pellets. At that moment, Clay Stone, the organizer of the cattle drive, appears along with some of their old friends, such as Ira and Barry Shalowitz. Clay explains that the cowboys are his sons and he has been looking for Duke for some time. Having left the cattle business, he is now making a living taking men on a trip to find the gold, which is revealed to be lead bars painted gold. Though Mitch, Phil, and Glen feel lost, Duke remains convinced that the gold is out there somewhere, and stays behind as the others return to Las Vegas.

Mitch is visited by Duke in his hotel room, who confesses that he had planned to cheat Mitch and the others out of the gold, but couldn't bring himself to do so, having found his 'one thing' to be honesty. Through Mitch's skepticism, Duke also reveals that he possesses the missing corner of the map, which points to where Lincoln reburied the gold in 1909, and presents a bar of it to Mitch as evidence. He tries to scratch the gold off with a knife, and screams in joy upon realizing that it is real after all.

Cast
 Billy Crystal as Mitch Robbins
 Daniel Stern as Phil Berquist
 Jon Lovitz as Glen Robbins
 Jack Palance as Duke Washburn
 Patricia Wettig as Barbara Robbins
 Noble Willingham as Clay Stone
 Pruitt Taylor Vince as Bud
 Bill McKinney as Matt
 David Paymer as Ira Shalowitz
 Josh Mostel as Barry Shalowitz
 Lindsay Crystal as Holly Robbins
 Beth Grant as Lois
 Jayne Meadows as The Voice of Mitch's Mother
 Jennifer Crystal as The Jogger
 Bob Balaban as Dr. Jeffrey Sanborn (uncredited)
 Frank Welker as Norman (voice)

Production
Parts of the film were shot in Arches National Park, Dugout Ranch, Professor Valley, and Goblin Valley in Utah. Bruno Kirby did not return to reprise his role as Ed Furrillo from the original film partly because he was highly allergic to horses and required constant allergy treatments to do his scenes.

In 2008, director Weiland later spoke of creative differences he had with Crystal, and that Crystal wanted to be director, leading to clashes.

Reception

Box office
City Slickers II: The Legend of Curly's Gold was released June 10, 1994, and came in 3rd place at the US box office, behind Speed and The Flintstones.
It went on to gross $43 million in the United States and Canada and $72 million worldwide.

Critical response
City Slickers II: The Legend of Curly's Gold received negative reviews from critics. On Rotten Tomatoes the film has an approval rating of 15% based on reviews from 26 critics. The site's critical consensus reads, "Lacking any of the charm of its predecessor, City Slickers 2 meanders around the map without ever finding comedy gold." On Metacritic the film has a score of 43 out of 100, based on reviews from 23 critics. Audiences surveyed by CinemaScore gave the film a grade A− on scale of A to F.

Roger Ebert of the Chicago Sun-Times wrote: "City Slickers II, subtitled The Legend of Curly's Gold, makes the mistake of thinking we care more about the gold than about the city slickers. Like too many sequels, it has forgotten what the first film was really about. Slickers II is about the MacGuffin instead of the characters."

Janet Maslin of The New York Times said that the film "has no real purpose beyond the obvious one of following up a hit, although the original film was just as casual at times. Both of them rely on Billy Crystal's breezy, dependably funny screen presence to hold the interest, even when not much around him is up to par. Both also count on the irascible Jack Palance, even though Mr. Palance's Curly was dead and buried when the first film was over."

Peter Rainer of the Los Angeles Times said that "with several years to ponder a way to honorably recycle 'City Slickers,' the filmmakers responsible for the sequel—director Paul Weiland and scripters Crystal, Lowell Ganz and Babaloo Mandel—have come up with a buried-treasure plot that would barely pass muster as an old Republic Pictures Western. The only things missing are the singing cowboys."

Year-end lists 
 9th worst – John Hurley, Staten Island Advance
 10th worst – Desson Howe, The Washington Post
 Top 18 worst (alphabetically listed, not ranked) – Michael Mills, The Palm Beach Post

Accolades
It was nominated for a Razzie Award for Worst Remake or Sequel and a Stinker for Worst Sequel.

References

External links

 
 
 

1994 films
1990s adventure comedy films
1990s buddy comedy films
1990s Western (genre) comedy films
American adventure comedy films
American buddy comedy films
American sequel films
Castle Rock Entertainment films
Columbia Pictures films
Films scored by Marc Shaiman
Films set in Westchester County, New York
Films shot in Utah
Midlife crisis films
Neo-Western films
Films with screenplays by Billy Crystal
Films with screenplays by Lowell Ganz
Films with screenplays by Babaloo Mandel
Treasure hunt films
American Western (genre) comedy films
Films directed by Paul Weiland
1994 comedy films
1990s English-language films
1990s American films